Nikita Aria Palekar also known as Supriya, is an Indian television presenter, creative director, model, actress, Veejay, western jazz, ballet, contemporary and classical dancer. She hosted several TV shows & live events, modeled in commercials and acted in prime time TV soaps, corporate and feature films in various languages.

Television shows (TV presenter)

Television Soaps

Filmography

See also
 List of Indian film actresses

References

Living people
Actresses in Hindi cinema
Indian film actresses
Indian voice actresses
Year of birth missing (living people)
Female models from Mumbai
Actresses in Tamil cinema
Actresses from Mumbai
20th-century Indian actresses
21st-century Indian actresses